Jack and Jill of America is a leadership organization formed during the Great Depression. It was formed in 1938 by African American mothers to bring together children in a social and cultural environment. It is headquartered in Washington, D.C. The organization aims to improve the quality of life of children, particularly African-American children.

There are more than 230 Jack and Jill chapters in 35 states across the United States, with more than 10,000 mother members and 40,000 parents and children.

History 

In January 1938, Marion Stubbs Thomas, a woman of "mulatto" ancestry, organized a group of twenty-one mothers in Philadelphia, Pennsylvania to establish a social and cultural union for their children. The group included a number of Black Catholics, one of the largest religious groups in Philadelphia. 

The second chapter of Jack and Jill was established in New York City in 1939, and a third in Washington, D.C. in 1940. The local group became an inter-city association, expanding to Pittsburgh; Baltimore; Boston; Buffalo; Columbus, Ohio; Durham, North Carolina; and Memphis, Tennessee between 1944 and June 1, 1946, when the national organization was founded.

In 1968, the organization created its philanthropic arm, the Jack and Jill of America Foundation, incorporated under the laws of the State of Illinois. The foundation has been responsible for the origin and funding of a large number of educational and charitable projects benefiting children and families in communities across the United States. Jack and Jill of America has made contributions to other organizations and projects, including: Africare, the United Negro College Fund, Rainbow/PUSH, King Center for Nonviolent Social Change, the NAACP Legal Defense and Educational Fund, the National Foundation for Infantile Paralysis (also called March of Dimes), the Children's Defense Fund, and to the Boys & Girls Clubs of America.

Jack and Jill of America celebrated its 75th anniversary in Philadelphia, PA in 2012 during the 40th National Convention, and again in April 2013.

Membership 
Mothers of children between the ages of 2 and 19 hold the membership and are required to plan and host monthly activities for the children. Children are divided into age groups (2–5, 6–9, 9–12, 12–14, and 9th through 12th grade) and take part in cultural activities, fundraising, leadership training, legislative events and social events. Mothers attend required monthly meetings and act on committees focused on the work of the organization, as well as larger efforts aimed to better the conditions of all children.

Mothers have to be invited into the group. Each chapter decides its own selection process; some include a prospective member and her family to participate as guests prior to being voted upon by the membership. Chapters may also, at their own discretion and often when the chapter has become too large, close their membership intake during a given year.

Graduates 
Graduating teenagers are recognized at the annual Regional Teen Conferences during an event where they are introduced to the other families in the membership and their guests, announce their college choice and are welcomed into the adult "village". Children who graduate out of the program are granted legacy status and may automatically join when they have children of their own.

References

External links 
 
 Jack and Jill Foundation

African-American organizations
African-American upper class
African-American women's organizations
Youth organizations established in 1938
1938 establishments in the United States
Black_elite
African-American Roman Catholicism